VenueWize is a web and mobile-based application created for event organizers. It lets event organizers collaborate on events, access real-time guest information during their events (via iPhone and iPad apps), track guest profitability and stay green.

The company started out by focusing on guest list creation and management by letting team members collaborate on lists which are then accessed by door managers using an iPhone. Since then, they ran an international pilot test in an attempt to best understand event organizers needs when it comes to metrics, and launched on December 1, 2011 with a focus on event analytics. The service now emphasizes automatic capturing of metrics and offers analytics to break down the successes and failures of an event.

VenueWize has been criticized for providing some features similar to the heavily used Eventbrite and Eventbee.

The company was awarded 2nd place at Simon Fraser University's 2011 Entrepreneur of the Year.

References

External links 
 VenueWize.com – Official Website

Online companies of Canada